Tricholoma albidum is a mushroom of the agaric genus Tricholoma.

See also
List of North American Tricholoma
List of Tricholoma species

References

albidum
Fungi described in 1890
Fungi of Europe
Fungi of North America